Thomas Maguire   was an American pitcher in the National League for the 1894 Cincinnati Reds. For years he was known as just McGuire before confirmation of his identity was found in 2014.

References

External links

Major League Baseball pitchers
19th-century baseball players
Cincinnati Reds players